San Jacinto County is a county in the U.S. state of Texas. As of the 2020 census, its population was 27,402. Its county seat is Coldspring. The county's name comes from the Battle of San Jacinto which secured Texas' independence from Mexico and established a republic in 1836.

Geography

Major highways
  U.S. Highway 59
  Interstate 69 is currently under construction and will follow the current route of U.S. 59 in most places.
  U.S. Highway 190
  State Highway 150
  State Highway 156

The TTC-69 component (recommended preferred) of the once-planned Trans-Texas Corridor went through San Jacinto County.

Adjacent counties
 Trinity County (north)
 Polk County (east)
 Liberty County (southeast)
 Montgomery County (southwest)
 Walker County (west)

National protected area
 Sam Houston National Forest (part)

Demographics

Note: the US Census treats Hispanic/Latino as an ethnic category. This table excludes Latinos from the racial categories and assigns them to a separate category. Hispanics/Latinos can be of any race.

As of the census of 2000, there were 22,246 people, 8,651 households, and 6,401 families residing in the county.  The population density was 39 people per square mile (15/km2).  There were 11,520 housing units at an average density of 20 per square mile (8/km2).  The racial makeup of the county was 83.64% White, 12.64% Black or African American, 0.46% Native American, 0.28% Asian, 0.07% Pacific Islander, 1.63% from other races, and 1.28% from two or more races.  4.87% of the population were Hispanic or Latino of any race.

There were 8,651 households, out of which 30.00% had children under the age of 18 living with them, 60.20% were married couples living together, 9.70% had a female householder with no husband present, and 26.00% were non-families. 22.60% of all households were made up of individuals, and 10.10% had someone living alone who was 65 years of age or older.  The average household size was 2.55 and the average family size was 2.98.

In the county, the population was spread out, with 25.20% under the age of 18, 7.40% from 18 to 24, 24.90% from 25 to 44, 26.60% from 45 to 64, and 15.90% who were 65 years of age or older.  The median age was 40 years. For every 100 females there were 100.50 males.  For every 100 females age 18 and over, there were 97.40 males.

The median income for a household in the county was $32,220, and the median income for a family was $37,781. Males had a median income of $34,614 versus $22,313 for females. The per capita income for the county was $16,144.  About 15.10% of families and 18.80% of the population were below the poverty line, including 22.80% of those under age 18 and 17.60% of those age 65 or over.

Politics

United States Congress

Texas Legislature

Texas Senate
District 3: Robert Nichols (R) – first elected in 2006.

Texas House of Representatives
District 18: Ernest Bailes (R) – first elected in 2016

Education
School districts include
 Coldspring-Oakhurst Consolidated Independent School District
 Shepherd Independent School District
 Cleveland Independent School District (partial)
 Willis Independent School District (partial)

Areas of San Jacinto County in Coldspring-Oakhurst CISD and Shepherd ISD are assigned to Angelina College. Areas in Cleveland ISD and Willis ISD are assigned to Lone Star College.

Communities

Cities
 Coldspring (county seat)
 Point Blank
 Shepherd

Census-designated places
 Cape Royale
 Oakhurst

See also

 List of museums in the Texas Gulf Coast
 National Register of Historic Places listings in San Jacinto County, Texas
 Recorded Texas Historic Landmarks in San Jacinto County
 Pine Island (Lake Livingston)

References

External links
 San Jacinto County government's website
 
 San Jacinto, TXGenWeb Focuses on genealogical research in San Jacinto County.

 
1870 establishments in Texas
Populated places established in 1870